Janma Janmada Anubandha is a 1980 Indian Kannada-language thriller drama film directed, co-produced and scripted by Shankar Nag. The film has an ensemble cast including Anant Nag, Shankar Nag, Jayanthi, Jayamala and Manjula.

Cast 
 Anant Nag as Avinash / Girish Achari
 Shankar Nag as Shiva Achari
 Jayanthi as Girish Achari's wife
 Jayamala as Avinash's fiancée
 Manjula as Shiva's love interest
 Master Rohith as young Avinash
 K. S. Ashwath as Avinash's uncle
 Tiger Prabhakar as Shiva's friend 
 Sundar Krishna Urs as Landlord
 Shakti Prasad as Landlord's servant 
 Advani Lakshmi Devi as Avinash's mother

Soundtrack 
The music of the film was composed by Ilaiyaraaja, with lyrics by Chi. Udaya Shankar. The songs "Thangaliyaali Naanu" is composed in Gowrimanohari raaga, "Yaava Shilpi" is composed in Gambheera Nattai raaga, and "Akashadinda Jaari" is composed in Mohana raaga. All songs composed for the film were received extremely well and considered evergreen hits.

References

External links 
 

1980 films
1980s Kannada-language films
Indian thriller drama films
Films about reincarnation
Films scored by Ilaiyaraaja
1980s thriller drama films
Films directed by Shankar Nag
1980 drama films